

Events
The headquarters of the On Leong Merchant Association is moved to N.Y, New York. 
Johnny Torrio, under the alias J.T. McCarthy, opens a saloon on New York's James Street and Walker Street which operates as a bordello. Hiring several former James Street Gang members, of which he was a member as a teenager, as protection he becomes involved in Paul Kelly's Five Points Gang becoming a top lieutenant by the following year. 
February 2 – Monk Eastman is arrested after fleeing from a failed robbery. Without protection from Tammany Hall, he is later sentenced to ten years in Sing Sing Prison.
November 1 – Richie Fitzpatrick is killed by "Kid Twist" Max Zwerbach during peace negotiations between the two rival factions of the Eastman Gang. Several weeks later the remaining men of Fitzpatrick's gang are killed by Zwerbach lieutenant Vach "Cyclone Louie" Lewis. 
November 4 – Hip Sing Tong leader Mock Duck is wounded in a gunfight by three On Leong hatchet men near his Pell Street home during the New York Tong war.

Births
Joseph Lanza "Socks", New York Fulton Fish Market waterfront leader 
James V. LaSala, New York (Brooklyn) mobster and Northern California drug trafficker 
James T. Licavoli, Cleveland Mafia leader
Ettore Zappi (aka Tony Russo), Gambino crime family Capo 
Anthony Anastasio bodyguard, and New York (Brooklyn) racketeer 
Frank Tieri "Funzi", Genovese crime family boss
February 4 – Frankie Carbo, boxing promoter and Murder, Inc. member

References 

Years in organized crime
Organized crime